HMS Northumberland was a 74-gun third-rate ship of the line of the Royal Navy, built at the yards of Barnard, Deptford and launched on 2 February 1798. She carried Napoleon to his final exile on St Helena.

Service history
Northumberland, and the brig  shared in the proceeds of the French polacca Vengeance, captured entering Valletta, Malta on 6 April 1800.

On 8 January 1801 Penelope captured the French bombard St. Roche, which was carrying wine, liqueurs, ironware, Delfth cloth, and various other merchandise, from Marseilles to Alexandria.

Because Northumberland served in the navy's Egyptian campaign (8 March to 8 September 1801), her officers and crew qualified for the clasp "Egypt" to the Naval General Service Medal that the Admiralty authorized in 1850 to all surviving claimants.

In August Northumberland detained and sent into Plymouth , a vessel that the French had captured on 1 July 1803 as Comet was sailing from England to Bengal under charter to the British East India Company. An American house with an office in London had purchased Comet at A Coruña as a prize and was sending her to London when Northumberland intercepted her.

Northumberland participated in the Battle of San Domingo (1806), where she was damaged, and suffered 21 killed and 74 wounded, the highest casualties of any British ship in the battle.

Following the concern in Britain that neutral Denmark was entering an alliance with Napoleon, Northumberland participated in the expedition to occupy the Danish West Indies. The British captured  St Thomas on 22 December and Santa Cruz on 25 December 1807. The Danes did not resist and the invasion was bloodless.

She received a measure of fame when she transported Napoleon I into captivity on the Island of Saint Helena. Napoleon was transferred in Tor Bay, Devon from Bellerophon to Northumberland for his final voyage to St. Helena because concerns were expressed about the suitability of the ageing ship. HMS Northumberland was therefore selected instead.

Northumberland shared with the tender Seagull in the proceeds of the seizure of some glass on Mary, of London, on 17 March 1817.

Fate
Northumberland was converted to a hulk in February 1827. She returned to Deptford to be broken up in 1850.

Notes, citations, and reference

Notes

Citations

References

 
 David Cordingly, The Billy Ruffian: The Bellerophon and the Downfall of Napoleon (Bloomsbury USA, 2003) 
 Lavery, Brian (2003) The Ship of the Line - Volume 1: The development of the battlefleet 1650-1850. Conway Maritime Press. .

External links
 

 

Ships of the line of the Royal Navy
America-class ships of the line
Ships built in Deptford
1798 ships